The abbreviation MSIC can stand for
Missile and Space Intelligence Center, an American military intelligence agency component
multi-strip ionization chamber (sometimes also dubbed as MuSIC), a type of radiation detector
Mixed Signal Integrated Circuit, a type of integrated circuit